Bologna Borgo Panigale is a railway station serving the suburb of Borgo Panigale, part of the city of Bologna, in the region of Emilia-Romagna, northern Italy. The station is located on the Porrettana railway. The train services are operated by Trenitalia Tper.

The station is currently managed by Rete Ferroviaria Italiana (RFI), a subsidiary of Ferrovie dello Stato Italiane (FSI), Italy's state-owned rail company.

Location
Bologna Borgo Panigale railway station is west of the city centre.

History
The station, formerly known as "Borgo Panigale", was renamed as "Bologna Borgo Panigale" in 1938. The suburb Borgo Panigale had been merged into the city of Bologna in 1937.

The station was downgraded to a railway halt on 21 December 2001.

Features
The station consists of two tracks linked by an underpass.

Train services

The station is served by the following service(s):
 Suburban services (Treno suburbano) on line S1A, Bologna - Porretta Terme
 Suburban services (Treno suburbano) on line S2A, Bologna - Vignola

See also

 List of railway stations in Bologna
 List of railway stations in Emilia-Romagna
 Bologna metropolitan railway service

References 

Railway stations in Bologna